Moulton is a surname. Notable people with the surname include:

Alex Moulton (1920–2012), British engineer and inventor of vehicle suspension systems and bicycles
Charles Moulton (disambiguation), multiple people
Dave Moulton, British custom bicycle frame maker
Forest Ray Moulton, American astronomer
Hugh Moulton (1876–1962), British Liberal Party politician, Member of Parliament
James Egan Moulton, first headmaster of Newington College, Australia, Methodist minister
James Hope Moulton, English academic, Methodist minister
John Coney Moulton, British military officer, entomologist and museum director
John Egan Moulton (1930–2012), Australian medical practitioner, Chairman of the NSW Institute of Sports Medicine and team doctor of the Australian national rugby union team
John Fletcher Moulton (1844–1941), English barrister, judge and Member of Parliament
Jon Moulton (born 1950), British venture capitalist
Jonathan Moulton, American general
Louise Chandler Moulton (1835-1908), American poet, story-writer, critic
Powers Moulton (1829–1904), American politician in Wisconsin
Sara Moulton, American celebrity chef
Seth Moulton, U.S. House member and former United States Marine Corps officer
Stephanie Moulton Sarkis, American psychotherapist and author
Stephen Moulton (1794–1880), British industrialist
Stephen Moulton (soldier), American Revolution figure
Terry Moulton (b. 1946), American politician in Wisconsin
Tom Moulton, American record producer
William Fiddian Moulton (1835–1898), English Methodist minister, Biblical scholar and educator